Kiwa Creek is a tributary of the Fraser River that extends from its source at Kiwa Glacier in the Cariboo Mountains to its confluence with the Fraser near Tête Jaune Cache, British Columbia. It is named from the Secwepemc word for "crooked".

References 

Rivers of British Columbia
Cariboo Land District